Angie Braziel (born September 18, 1976) is a retired Women's National Basketball Association (WNBA) player, most recently signed to the Washington Mystics, though she retired from the league before playing a game on her new team. She also played two seasons with the Charlotte Sting and one with the Indiana Fever. Her career began at Texas Tech where she scored 1,131 points in three seasons.  After several injuries and at one point three operations in the span of a year, Braziel retired and returned to west Texas to coach girls' basketball in public schools.

USA Basketball

Braziel was named to the team representing the US at the 1998 William Jones Cup competition in Taipei, Taiwan. Braziel was the leading scorer, with 14 points, in the 67–40 win over Thailand, which sent the team to the gold medal game. She averaged 5.4 points per game over the five games.

References

External links
Player profile

1976 births
Living people
All-American college women's basketball players
American women's basketball coaches
American women's basketball players
Basketball coaches from Texas
Basketball players from Texas
Charlotte Sting players
Indiana Fever players
Small forwards
Texas Tech Lady Raiders basketball players